Ana III Guterres (died 1767) was the queen regnant of the Kingdom of Ndongo and Matamba (in modern-day Angola) from 1758 to 1767. 

She was the daughter of queen Ana II Guterres  and the sister of queen Verónica II Guterres. She had two daughters, Kamana and Murili. In 1756, her mother died and was succeeded by her sister Verónica II, who had been their mother's designated heir and crown princess. In 1758, after only about two years' of reign, Verónica II was deposed in a coup d'etat by her sister, who took the throne under the name of Ana III and had her sister executed by decapitation.  Ana III reigned for about twelve years.  

In 1767, she was deposed and executed by her nephew Francisco II Kalwete ka Mbandi (possibly the son of Verónica II).  Her death resulted in a longgoing succession crisis, in which her two daughters left for Kidona in Kwanza, where they proclaimed the Kingdom of Jinga under the rule of queen Kamana, contesting the right of Francisco II after their mother and establishing a rival Kingdom within the borders of his own Kingdom. The conflict lasted until 1800, when Francisco II recognized the Kingdom of Jinga and acknowledged Kamala's right to rule there. The Kingdom of Ndongo and Matamba was not united until 1810, when Francisco II and Kamala both died and the Portuguese supported Kamala's son Ndala Kamana (d. 1833), when he successfully united the Kingdom under his own rule.  

Issue
 Kamana (d. 1810), queen regnant of Jinga 1767-1810. 
 Princess Murili

References 

 Anthony Appiah, Henry Louis Gates,  Encyclopedia of Africa, Volym 1
 Fernando Campos: Conflitos na dinastia Guterres através da sua cronologia1, África: Revista do Centro de Estudos Africanos. USP, S. Paulo, 27-28: 23-43, 2006/2007

African royalty
Women rulers in Africa
Matamban and Ndongo monarchs
18th-century women rulers
18th-century monarchs in Africa
1767 deaths
18th-century executions
Executed monarchs
Dethroned monarchs
People executed by decapitation
18th century in Angola